Who's the Man? is a single by rap group, House of Pain.  It was released in 1993  and was featured on the soundtrack of the motion picture, Who's the Man?, in which the group appeared. The song was produced by members DJ Lethal and Everlast and rose to number 97 on the Billboard Hot 100 and 77 Hot R&B/Hip-Hop Singles & Tracks. It later appeared on the group's sophomore effort Same as It Ever Was. The chorus contains a sample of "Who's the Man? (With the Master Plan)" by The Kay-Gees.

Track listing

A-Side
"Who's the Man?"- 4:03  
"Who's the Man?" (instrumental)- 4:03

B-Side
"Put on Your Shit Kickers"- 4:03  
"Put on Your Shit Kickers" (instrumental)- 4:03

Charts

External links

House of Pain songs
1993 singles
Songs written for films
1993 songs
Tommy Boy Records singles